HMT Bradman (FY 189) was a 452-ton anti-submarine warfare trawler of the Royal Navy during the Second World War. She was built by Cochrane & Sons, Selby and was launched on 31 October 1936. As a fishing vessel of the Bunch Steam Fishing company she was registered at Grimsby.
In the leadup to the war she was requisitioned by the Admiralty on 26 August 1939 and commissioned into the Royal Navy in October.

In the Norwegian campaign she was damaged by German aircraft on 25 April 1940 and run aground.

Fate
Bradman was sunk by German aircraft in Romdalsfjord on 25 April 1940. She was refloated by German forces on 11 July, and returned to service as the Vorpostenboot V6112 Friese.

References

HMT Bradman (+1940) wrecksite.eu

1936 ships
Ships sunk by German aircraft
Ships sunk by Soviet submarines
Anti-submarine trawlers of the Royal Navy
Maritime incidents in April 1940
Ships built in Selby
Don Bradman
World War II shipwrecks in the North Sea